Methyl isoeugenol (isomethyleugenol) is a phenylpropanoid, the methyl ether of isoeugenol, found in certain essential oils. It can occur as both (E)- and (Z)-isomers.

See also 
 Methyl eugenol

References

O-methylated phenylpropanoids
Phenylpropenes